Iphiclides podalirinus, the Chinese scarce swallowtail, is a species of butterfly from the family Papilionidae that is found in China and Tibet.

This species was formerly considered a subspecies of Iphiclides podalirius.

References

Iphiclides
Butterflies described in 1890
Butterflies of Asia